Shahbazian or Shahbazyan is an Armenian/Iranian patronymic surname. Related surname: Shahbazi. It is derived from the word "Shahbaz" + patronymic suffix "-ian"/"-yan" meaning "descendant of".

The surname may refer to:

Edmen Shahbazyan (born 1997), American mixed martial artist of Armenian descent
Fereydoun Shahbazian (Fereidoon Shahbazian), Iranian musician and composer
Sebo Shahbazian, Iranian soccer player

patronymic surnames